Partula nodosa or Polynesian Tree Snail is a species of air-breathing tropical land snail, a terrestrial pulmonate gastropod mollusk in the family Partulidae.

Distribution
This species was endemic to Tahiti, French Polynesia. It is now extinct in the wild.

References

External links

Partula (gastropod)
Taxonomy articles created by Polbot
Gastropods described in 1851